Better Days is a 2005 studio album by the contemporary Christian Robbie Seay Band.

Track listing

2005 albums
Robbie Seay Band albums